Banger leben kürzer (German for "Bangers live shorter") is the third album by German rapper Farid Bang, released on 18 February 2011 by German Dream.

Music 
The album contains many gangsta rap songs such as "Du Fils de Pute", "Bitte Spitte 5000" und "Willkommen auf der Kö"). Deep-themed songs such as "Teufelskreis" and "Dreh die Zeit zurück" can be found more often, than on his previous releases. The title song is a diss track aimed at Sido.

Track listing 

2011 albums
German-language albums
Farid Bang albums